Louis B. Rosenfeld (born c. 1965) is an American information architect, consultant, author and publisher, known as co-author of Information Architecture for the World Wide Web.

Biography 
Rosenfeld earned his B.A. in history from the University of Michigan in 1987, and his Master's in library science from the University of Michigan School of Information in 1990.

Along with Peter Morville, he was the co-founder of Argus Associates, one of the first firms devoted exclusively to the practice of information architecture. With Christina Wodtke, Rosenfeld founded the Information Architecture Institute in 2002 and is a member of its Advisory Board. In 2005 he founded Rosenfeld Media, a user experience publishing house. He was also co-founder of the User Experience Network (UXnet)

Selected publications 
Books:
 Louis Rosenfeld, Morville, Peter, and Jorge Arango. Information architecture for the World Wide Web: For the Web and Beyond. O'Reilly Media, Inc., 2015.
 Louis Rosenfeld. Search Analytics for Your Site: Conversation With Your Consumers. 2011
 Morville, P., Janes, J., Rosenfeld, L., Candido, G. A., Rosenfeld, L. B., & Decandido, G. A. (1999). The Internet Searcher's Handbook: Locating Information, People, and Software. Neal-Schuman Publishers, Inc..

Articles, a selection:
 Rosenfeld, Louis. "Moment Prisons, and How to Escape Them." Medium (2019).
 Rosenfeld, Louis. "Seeing the Elephant: Defragmenting User Research." A List Apart (2013).
 Rosenfeld, Louis. "Information architecture: looking ahead." Journal of the American Society for Information Science and technology 53.10 (2002): 874-876.
 Janes, Joseph W., and Louis B. Rosenfeld. "Networked information retrieval and organization: Issues and questions." Journal of the American Society for Information Science 47.9 (1996): 711-715.

References

External links
 Rosenfeld's personal site

Year of birth missing (living people)
Living people
Information architects
Web developers
Computer programmers
American technology writers
University of Michigan School of Information alumni
University of Michigan College of Literature, Science, and the Arts alumni